2048 may refer to:
AD 2048, a year in the 2040s
2048 (number)
2048 (video game), a puzzle game
2048: Nowhere to Run, a 2017 American science-fiction film